Rippey Cobblestone Farmhouse is a historic home located at Phelps in Ontario County, New York. It was constructed in 1854 and is an example of a Greek Revival / Italianate style, cobblestone domestic architecture. The house consists of a two-story main block with a one-story side wing and is one of the most elaborate, finely crafted cobblestone residences in the Finger Lakes region.  The exterior walls are built primarily of small, red, oval, lake washed cobbles. It is among the approximately 101 cobblestone buildings in Ontario County and nine in the town of Seneca.

It was listed on the National Register of Historic Places in 1992.

References

Houses on the National Register of Historic Places in New York (state)
Greek Revival houses in New York (state)
Italianate architecture in New York (state)
Cobblestone architecture
Houses completed in 1854
Houses in Ontario County, New York
National Register of Historic Places in Ontario County, New York